Swedish Armed Forces International Service Medal of Reward (FMintbGMmsv or FMintbSMmsv) is a Swedish reward medal established by the Swedish Armed Forces in 1995.

History
The regulations for the Swedish Armed Forces International Service Medal of Reward (TFG 950003) comes under the Supreme Commander's decision on 14 March 1995 which reads as follows: The medal and a certificate is awarded to individual as a reward for commendable efforts during UN service or other international service:

In 2007, this medal was merged with the Swedish Armed Forces Medal of Merit (the 1995 medal) and instead the Swedish Armed Forces Medal of Merit was established in 2008.

Criteria
Criteria:

Recipients
17 November 1997 - Colonel Ulf Henricsson (awarded on 4 March 1998)
2001 -  Major Jörgen Öberg

Notes

I.  Officially called Försvarsmaktens belöningsmedalj med svärd för internationella insatser ("Swedish Armed Forces International Service Medal of Reward with Swords") but more often called Försvarsmaktens belöningsmedalj för internationella insatser in gold or silver (with swords), ("Swedish Armed Forces International Service Medal of Reward in gold or silver (with swords)") and sometimes wrongly called Försvarsmaktens medalj för internationella insatser i guld i blått band med svärd i guld ("Swedish Armed Forces International Service Medal in Gold with blue ribbon and sword in gold") which is a different medal which does not include swords.

References

Orders, decorations, and medals of Sweden
Awards established in 1995
Awards disestablished in 2007
1995 establishments in Sweden
2007 disestablishments in Sweden